Massimo Bitonci (born 24 June 1965, in Padua) is an Italian Venetist politician. He is a member of Liga Veneta–Lega Nord, which he has served as national president since 2016.

In 1993, he joined Lega Nord and was deputy mayor of Cittadella from 1994 to 2002. During his second term he followed mayor Lucio Facco into Liga Veneta Repubblica (LVR). With the support of LVR he ran for mayor in 2002 and was elected with 50.9% of the vote in a run-off, defeating Liga Veneta in one of its traditional strongholds.

In 2007 he was re-elected mayor with the 56.5% of the vote in the first round. In that occasion he was supported by a regionalist front composed of Liga Veneta, LVR and some civic lists, which won altogether 51.7% of the vote.

In the 2008 general election Bitonci was elected to the Chamber of Deputies, where he sat in the parliamentary group of Lega Nord. He trailed the electoral result of the party in the Province of Padua, where Lega Nord passed from 7.7% to 24.1% in two years, and especially in Cittadella, where the party quadrupled its score from 11.6% to 42.2%.

In the 2013 general election Bitonci was elected to the Senate, where he was appointed floor leader of his party.

In June 2014 Bitonci was elected mayor of Padua (31.4% in the first round, 53.5% in the run-off). However, in November 2016, having lost the support of the majority of the municipal council, he was dismissed as mayor and the council was subsequently dissolved. In June 2017 Bitonci came first in the first round of the municipal election with 40.3%, but was finally defeated by Sergio Giordani, a left-leaning independent, 48.2% to 51.8% in the run-off.

References

1965 births
Living people
Lega Nord politicians
Venetist politicians
Deputies of Legislature XVI of Italy
Senators of Legislature XVII of Italy
Deputies of Legislature XVIII of Italy
Mayors of Padua